Rievaulx Terrace is a site located in the North York Moors National Park, in North Yorkshire, England, overlooking Rievaulx Abbey and owned by the National Trust.
The site is a grass-covered terrace following a serpentine course across the side of a wooded escarpment overlooking the ruins of the abbey. At either end of the terrace stand two mid-18th century follies: small Palladian temples.

History
The Terrace is on land that was, until the Dissolution of the Monasteries, owned by Rievaulx Abbey. It was then granted to Thomas Manners, 1st Earl of Rutland and it passed from him to the George Villiers, 1st Duke of Buckingham. On the death of his son it was sold to Sir Charles Duncombe in 1687 and inherited by his nephew Thomas Duncombe in 1711.

The site was created in 1758 by Thomas Duncombe III who had inherited it from his father along with the adjoining Helmsley estate (now Duncombe Park) some ten years previously. His desire was to complement, and perhaps even surpass, the more formal terrace and temples laid out in about 1730 by his father at Duncombe Park house a mile away. It is thought that he may have planned to join the two terraces by a scenic drive along the River Rye.

Two temples are on the site. At the south-east end of the terrace is the domed Doric or Tuscan Temple, thought to be a scaled-down version of the mausoleum at Castle Howard a few miles away. The pavement floor came from the choir of Rievaulx Abbey.

At the opposite end stands the Ionic Temple, inspired by the Temple of Fortuna Virilis in Rome. It was intended as a banqueting house and the central table is still set as if for a meal. It is decorated with elaborate ceiling paintings and is furnished in the period style. The basement housed the kitchen and living quarters and nowadays it holds an exhibition on English landscape design in the 18th century.

Duncombe's descendant, the third and last Earl of Feversham, died in 1963. In 1972 the site and the adjoining woods were purchased by the National Trust.

Gallery

References

External links

Rievaulx Terrace information at the National Trust

Gardens in North Yorkshire
Buildings and structures in North Yorkshire
National Trust properties in North Yorkshire
Tourist attractions in North Yorkshire